The Tawira Miskito are indigenous peoples of Nicaragua. They are a band of Miskito people and live in the southern part of the Mosquito Coast. They are also known as Tauira and Tawira. They speak the Tawira language.

The Tawira are related to the Miskito Sambu, who intermarried with Africans who had shipwrecked on the coast in the mid-seventeenth century.  The term is unattested before the early nineteenth century, though it may have come into existence before that time.

References

Miskito